Alok Pandey (born 30 April 1988) is an Indian actor and model who is best known for playing MS Dhoni’s best friend in the former Indian Cricket Team captain’s biopic M.S. Dhoni: The Untold Story”, a negative role with John Abraham in Batla House and a major role in Lucknow Central. He performed packed role in a short film entitled “KKKK…KIRAN”. He has also played roles in films like PK, Prem Ratan Dhan Payo, Sanam Teri Kasam, Special Ops, One Day: Justice Delivered, etc.

Early life 
Pandey was born in a village named Dadoun, Shahjahanpur. During his college days, he went to watch a theater play with his friends (Ravi Chauhan and Dharmendra Singh Sisodiya). While watching this play, the idea of becoming an actor came into his mind.

Career 
Pandey joined the "Sanskriti Theater Group" in 2007. He learned acting tricks from his mentor Alok Saxena in this theater group. Later, he joined the "Bhartendu Natya Akademi" (BNA) (new name is "Bharatendu Academy of Dramatic Arts") in Gomti Nagar. He is a 2011 batch pass-out, got opened the BM Shah auditorium where he staged his first professional theater play. He performed several shows in Lucknow BNA. After that he got selected in Satyajit Ray Film and Television Institute in Kolkata. Here, he learned a lot from fellow actor Vipin Sharma. After a year, in December 2012, finally he came to Mumbai. Theater friend Manoj Sharma was already in Mumbai, so he sheltered Pandey. Then, he did a small role in CID serial for a few months, where he got his first payment of ₹3000. But soon, he got a good role with Ravi Khemu's serial Hamarey Gaon Koi Ayega in the lead role of Gulam Nabi, which he was making for Doordarshan. Meanwhile, Pandey get a chance to do work with Anurag Kashyap's short film That Day After Everyday, opposite Radhika Apte. Then he got to work in Salman Khan's Prem Ratan Dhan Payo that assigned with Rajshri Productions directed by Sooraj Barjatya. During this film, casting director Vicky Sidana came in contact and because of that, Pandey later got to work in films like M. S. Dhoni: The Untold Story and Lucknow Central.

Filmography

References

External links

Indian male film actors
Male actors in Hindi cinema
Living people
Male actors from Uttar Pradesh
People from Shahjahanpur
21st-century Indian male actors
1988 births